The following are the basketball events that took place in 2017 throughout the world.  
Tournaments include international (FIBA), professional (club) and amateur and collegiate levels.

National team tournaments

FIBA continental cups  
Men:

AfroBasket 2017 in Dakar and Tunis
 
 
 
2017 FIBA AmeriCup in Medellín, Montevideo, Bahía Blanca and Córdoba
 
 
 

2017 FIBA Asia Cup in Beirut
 
 
 
EuroBasket 2017 in Helsinki, Tel Aviv, Cluj-Napoca and Istanbul
 
 
 

Women:

AfroBasket Women 2017 in Bamako
 
 
 
2017 FIBA Women's AmeriCup in Buenos Aires
 
 
 

2017 FIBA Asia Women's Cup in Bangalore
 
 
 
EuroBasket Women 2017 in the Czech Republic

Other national team championships 
In SABA and SEABA Championships, only the champion team will be able qualify to FIBA Asia Cup. Those teams winning the tournament are shown in bold text.
Men:
2017 EABA Championship in Tokyo:
 
 
 
2017 Island Games at Gotland:
 
 
 
2017 SABA Championship at Malé:
 
 
 
2017 SEABA Championship in Quezon City:
 
 
 
2017 Southeast Asian Games at Kuala Lumpur:
 
 
 
2017 WABA Championship in Amman:
 
 
 
2017 FIBA 3x3 World Cup at Nantes:
 
 
 
2017 William Jones Cup in Taipei:
  Team Canada 150
  Atletas All-Star Lithuania
 
2017 Games of the Small States of Europe at San Marino:
 
 
 
Women:
2017 Island Games at Gotland:
 
 
 
2017 Southeast Asian Games at Kuala Lumpur:
 
 
 
2017 William Jones Cup in Taipei:
 
 
 
2017 Games of the Small States of Europe at San Marino:

FIBA youth championships 
Men:
2017 FIBA Under-19 Basketball World Cup in Cairo:
 
 
 

2017 FIBA Africa Under-16 Championship:
 
 
 
2017 FIBA Americas Under-16 Championship:
 
 
 
2017 FIBA Asia Under-16 Championship:
 
 
 

2017 FIBA Europe Under-16 Championship:
 
 
 
2017 FIBA Oceania Under-16 Championship:
 
 
 

2017 FIBA Europe Under-18 Championship in Bratislava:
 
 
 
2017 FIBA Europe Under-20 Championship in Crete:
 
 
 
Women:
2017 FIBA Under-19 Women's Basketball World Cup in Italy:
 
 
 

2017 FIBA Africa Under-16 Championship for Women:
 
 
 
2017 FIBA Americas Under-16 Championship for Women:
 
 
 
2017 FIBA Asia Under-16 Championship for Women in Bengaluru:
 
 
 

2017 FIBA Europe Under-16 Championship for Women in Bratislava:
 
 
 
2017 FIBA Oceania Under-16 Championship for Women:

Other FIBA-sanctioned youth tournaments 
Team in bold wins the championship while in italic is the team who qualify for the continental Championship they belong to.

Men's Division:
 2017 SEABA Under-16 Championship in Quezon City:

Professional club seasons

FIBA Intercontinental Cup

Continental seasons

Men

Women

Regional seasons

Men

Women

Domestic league seasons

Men

Women

College seasons

Headlines 
 December 19 – The Naismith Memorial Basketball Hall of Fame announces significant changes to its enshrinement process.
 Effective immediately, players, coaches, and referees will now be eligible for induction after three full seasons of retirement.
 Effective with the induction class of 2020, active coaches must have served in that role for 25 years and be at least age 60.

Deaths
January 23 — Earl Foreman, American ABA owner (Virginia Squires) (born 1924)
January 26 — Mario Quintero, Cuban Olympic player (1948, 1952) (born 1924)
January 27 — Charles Shackleford, American NBA player (New Jersey Nets, Philadelphia 76ers) (born 1966)
January 31 — Bobby Watson, American NBA player (Minneapolis Lakers, Milwaukee Hawks) and college national champion at Kentucky (1951) (born 1930)
February 11 — Fab Melo, Brazilian NBA player (Boston Celtics) (born 1990)
February 19 — Dean Ehlers, American college coach (Memphis, James Madison) (born 1929)
February 25 — Neil Fingleton, British player (CB Illescas) (born 1980)
March 6 – Bill Hougland, American player (Phillips 66ers) and Olympic champion (1952, 1956) (born 1930)
March 10 – Ben Jobe, American college coach (Southern, South Carolina State, Alabama A&M) (born 1933)
March 13 – John Andariese, American college and NBA announcer (New York Knicks) (born 1938)
March 15 – Dave Stallworth, American NBA player (New York Knicks, Baltimore Bullets) (born 1941)
March 15 – Chris Williams, American player (Sydney Kings, Skyliners Frankfurt, Qingdao DoubleStar) (born 1980)
March 18 – Gerry Gimelstob, American college coach (George Washington) (born 1951)
March 20 – David Lawrence, American player (McNeese State, Pallacanestro Trieste, Saski Baskonia) (born 1959)
March 21 – Jerry Krause, American NBA executive (Chicago Bulls) (born 1939)
March 29 – Wayne Duke, Hall of Fame college administrator (Big Eight Conference, Big Ten Conference) (born 1928)
April 20 – Skeeter Swift, American ABA player (New Orleans Buccaneers, Pittsburgh Condors, San Antonio Spurs) and college coach (Liberty) (born 1946)
April 22 – Jess Kersey, American NBA referee (born 1941)
April 23 – Ken Sears, American NBA player (New York Knicks, San Francisco Warriors) (born 1933)
May 2 – Toby Kimball, American NBA player (born 1942)
May 4 – Jay Carty, American NBA player (Los Angeles Lakers) (born 1941)
May 8 – Chuck Orsborn, American college coach (Bradley) (born 1917)
May 8 – George Irvine, American ABA player (Virginia Squires, Denver Nuggets) and NBA coach (Indiana Pacers, Detroit Pistons) (born 1948)
May 13 – Ron Bontemps, American Olympic player (1952) (born 1926)
May 14 – Frank Brian, American NBA player (Anderson Packers, Tri-Cities Blackhawks, Fort Wayne Pistons) (born 1923)
May 27 – Robert Curtis, American NBL Canada player (Saint John Mill Rats) (born 1990)
May 31 – Ramon Campos Jr., Filipino Olympic player (1948, 1952, 1956) (born 1925)
June 1 – Jack McCloskey, American NBA player (Philadelphia Warriors) and coach (Portland Trail Blazers) and college coach (Penn, Wake Forest) (born 1925)
June 10 – Mihai Nedef, Romanian Olympic player (1952) (born 1931)
June 17 – Omar Monza, Argentine Olympic player (1952) (born 1929)
June 30 – Darrall Imhoff, American college All-American (California), NBA player and Olympic Gold medalist (1960) (born 1938)
July 4 – Gene Conley, American NBA player (Boston Celtics, New York Knicks) (born 1930)
July 6 – Les Habegger, 92, American college (Seattle Pacific) and NBA coach (Seattle SuperSonics).
July 11 – Bill Chambers, American college player and coach (William & Mary) (born 1930)
July 14 – Ross Giudice, American college coach (San Francisco) (born 1924)
July 15 – Bob Wolff, American announcer (New York Knicks, Detroit Pistons) (born 1920)
July 16 – Jerry Bird, American NBA player (New York Knicks) (born 1934)
July 23 – John Kundla, American Hall of Fame coach (Minneapolis Lakers, Minnesota Golden Gophers) (born 1916)
August 3 – Dickie Hemric, American NBA player (Boston Celtics) (born 1933)
August 13 – Nick Mantis, American NBA player (Minneapolis Lakers, St. Louis Hawks, Chicago Zephyrs) (born 1935)
August 16 – Tom Hawkins, American NBA player (Los Angeles Lakers, Cincinnati Royals) (born 1936)
August 26 – Adam Wójcik, Polish player (Śląsk Wrocław, Prokom Sopot, Turów Zgorzelec) (born 1970)
August 28 – Jud Heathcote, American college coach (Montana, Michigan State) (born 1927)
August 30 – Rollie Massimino, American college coach (Villanova, UNLV, Cleveland State) (born 1934)
September 6 — Jim McDaniels, American NBA (Seattle SuperSonics, Los Angeles Lakers, Buffalo Braves) and ABA (Carolina Cougars, Kentucky Colonels) player. (born 1948)
September 17 — Cris Bolado, Filipino player (Alaska Aces, Star Hotshots, San Miguel Beermen) (born 1969)
September 21 – Glen Whisby, 44, American player
September 23 — Loreto Carbonell, Filipino Olympic player (1956) (born 1933)
September 30 — Frank Hamblen, American NBA coach (Milwaukee Bucks, Los Angeles Lakers) (born 1947)
October 1 — Dave Strader, American college announcer (born 1955)
October 6 — Connie Hawkins, American Hall of Fame Harlem Globetrotters, ABA and NBA player (Phoenix Suns, Los Angeles Lakers) (born 1942)
October 16 — Kevin Cadle, American basketball coach (Kingston Kings, British national team) and NBA announcer (born 1955)
October 19 — Dick DiBiaso, 76, American college coach (Stanford).
October 20 — Justin Reed, American NBA player (Boston Celtics, Minnesota Timberwolves) (born 1982)
October 30 — János Halász, Hungarian Olympic player (1948) (born 1929)
October 31 — Red Murrell, American college (Drake) and AAU (Phillips 66ers) player (born 1933) 
November 3 — Sid Catlett, American player (Cincinnati Royals) (born 1948)
November 5 — Don Eddy, American college coach (Eastern Illinois, UTSA) (born 1935)
November 13 — Jeff Capel II, American college coach (Fayetteville State, North Carolina A&T, Old Dominion) (born 1953)
November 17 — Aleksandr Salnikov, Ukrainian Olympic player (1976, 1980) (born 1949)
November 19 — Luther Rackley, American NBA and ABA player (born 1946)
November 19 — Elias Tolentino, Filipino Olympic player (1968) (born 1942)
November 25 — Steve "Snapper" Jones, American ABA and NBA player and NBA announcer (born 1942)
December 1 — Perry Wallace, American college player (Vanderbilt) and first African-American player in the Southeastern Conference (born 1948)
December 4 — Armenak Alachachian, Armenian Olympic Silver Medalist (1964) (born 1930)
December 6 — George E. Killian, American administrator. President of FIBA and the Naismith Memorial Basketball Hall of Fame (born 1924)
December 7 — Roland Taylor, American ABA/NBA player (Virginia Squires, Denver Nuggets) (born 1946)
December 11 — Birgir Örn Birgis, Icelandic national team player and coach (born 1942)
December 21 — Dick Enberg, college announcer (UCLA) (born 1935)
December 25 – Michael Britt, 57, American college player (District of Columbia).
December 26 — Orsten Artis, American college player (UTEP), NCAA champion (1966) (born 1943)

See also
 Timeline of women's basketball

References